Dr. Jabbar Patel (born 23 June 1942, Pandharpur) is a former paediatrician and a Marathi-language theatre and film director of India. His production of the play Vijay Tendulkar's play Ghashiram Kotwal, in 1973 is considered a classic in Modern Indian Theatre.

He is the maker of classics films in Marathi cinema, like, Samna Jait Re Jait (Mohan Agashe, Smita Patil), Umbartha (Smita Patil, Girish Karnad), Simhasan (Nana Patekar, Shreeram Lagoo, Reema Lagoo) Some of his other films are, Mukta, Ek Hota Vidushak, and Musafir (Hindi). His most acclaimed film is Dr. Babasaheb Ambedkar released in 1999. He won the 1995 Nargis Dutt Award for Best Feature Film on National Integration for his Marathi film, Mukta.

Personal life
Patel was born in 1942 in Pandharpur in present day Indian state of Maharashtra. His father was employed in Indian Railways. He obtained his early school education in Haribhai Deokaran High school Solapur. He qualified as a doctor, specialising in paediatric medicine from B. J. Medical College in Pune. He and his wife, a gynecologist ran a clinic in Daund near Pune.The couple have two daughters.

Theater
Patel started acting while in elementary school. In Solapur, he lived with Shriram Pujari, who was an influential personality in that city. Staying at his home, Jabbar Patel was able to take a closer look at the people from Marathi theatre world who used to stay at the Pujari residence. The roles he played in his high school play Chaphekar, in the silent drama, Hadacha zunzar aahes tu, as well of Shyam in 'Tujh Hai Tujpashi' while in college were appreciated.

Patel started his career with the Marathi experimental theatre group, Progressive Dramatic association (PDA) founded by Bhalba Kelkar. In PDA produced plays, he acted as well as directed. He directed Vijay tendulkar's Ashi Pakhare yeti for PDA which was a great commercial success. In 1972, Patel and colleagues such as Mohan Agashe, and Satish Alekar broke away from PDA over differences on staging their new production, Ghashiram Kotwal written by Vijay Tendulkar. They formed a new group called Theatre Academy. After Ghashiram Kotwal, the group produced 'Teen Paishacha Tamasha', an adaptation of Brecht's Threepenny Opera in 1974.

Cinema
He wrote the lyrics of the song 'Raya asa Zombu naka angala' from the film 'Samna'. He has worked on the film based on the life and work of Santoor maestro Pandit Shivkumar Sharma.

For Jabbar Patel, tackling a political subject is not something new. Whether it was Umbartha, Jait Re Jait, or Simhasan for the silver screen, or Ghasiram Kotwal for the stage, he has handled political subjects. His recent film is also political based "Yashwantrao Chavan".

Jait Re Jait (1977) is a musical milestone in the history of Indian cinema, and expresses the stories of a forgotten tribe through dance and a total of 19 songs. Next came Simhasan (1981) made in a montage style with 35 characters. Both won National Awards. One of Patel’s most acclaimed works is Umbartha (1981), a film featuring Smita Patil as the superintendent of a woman’s reform home.

Filmography
 Samna (1974)
 Jait Re Jait (1977)
 Sinhasan (1979)
 Umbartha (1982)
 Musafir (1986)
 Maharashtra (1986)
 Mi SM (1987)
 Pathik (1988)
 Kusumagraj
 Laxman Joshi (1989)
 Indian Theatre (1990)
 Forts of Maharashtra (1990)
 Dr. Babasaheb Ambedkar (Documentary) (1991)
 Ek Hota Vidushak (1992)
 Mukta (1994)
 Dr. Babasaheb Ambedkar (2000)
 Hans Akela (Kumar Gandharva) (2005)
 Teesri Azadi (2006)
 Yashwantrao Chavan – Bakhar Eka Vaadalaachi  (2014)

Festival circuit
Jabbar Patel is the chairman of the Pune Film Foundation, and the festival director of the Pune International Film Festival. First Edition of PIFF was started in year 2002 and has been running annually.

References

External links 
 

1942 births
Living people
Film directors from Maharashtra
Indian theatre directors
Indian Muslims
Marathi film directors
People from Solapur district
Recipients of the Padma Shri in arts
20th-century Indian film directors
Recipients of the Sangeet Natak Akademi Award
Directors who won the Best Film on National Integration National Film Award